Count Pavel Nikolayevich Ignatiev (sometimes rendered in English as Paul Ignatieff; June 30/July 12, 1870 – August 12, 1945) was an Imperial Russian politician who served as Education Minister for Tsar Nicholas II. He was the son of Count Nikolay Pavlovich Ignatyev, who was the Minister of the Interior under Tsar Alexander III. After the October Revolution brought the Bolsheviks into power, Ignatieff fled Russia with his family, ultimately ending up in Canada.

Life and family
Ignatieff married Princess Natalia Nikolayevna Meshcherskaya (1877-1944) in Nice, France, on April 16, 1903. They would have seven children, all boys, two of whom died as infants.

He was a graduate of the University of Kyiv. Afterward, he entered the Imperial Ministry of Agriculture, eventually becoming a director of one of its departments in 1909. He was appointed in 1912 as Assistant Minister of Agriculture. In 1915, during the First World War, he was appointed Minister of Education. He held that position until December 1916.

During the October Revolution, Ignatieff was arrested and was to be executed. However, he was spared by the Polish commissar overseeing his execution, who said that Ignatieff was a good man because he had implemented progressive policies such as Polish language rights while Education Minister. Ignatieff and his family then fled to England in 1919 and lived on a farm in Sussex, before moving to Canada.

In 1925, the family immigrated to Canada and settled permanently three years later in Upper Melbourne in Quebec, where he died on August 12, 1945.

One of Ignatieff's sons, George, was a prominent Canadian diplomat. One of his grandsons, Michael Ignatieff, is an author, Harvard professor, former Canadian Member of Parliament and former leader of the Liberal Party of Canada.

References

 Ignatieff, Michael. The Russian album.  New York, N.Y.: Viking, 1987.
 "Countess Ignatieff". New York Times, 30 Aug 1944: 17.
 Index with link to Ignatieff genealogical information
 "Nicholas Ignatieff". New York Times, 30 Mar 1952: 93.
Out of My Past: The Memoirs of Count Kokovtsov Edited by H.H. Fisher and translated by Laura Matveev; Stanford University Press, 1935.
The Memoirs of Count Witte Edited and translated by Sydney Harcave; Sharpe Press, 1990.

1870 births
1945 deaths
Government ministers of Russia
Emigrants from the Russian Empire to Canada
Politicians of the Russian Empire
Counts of the Russian Empire
White Russian emigrants to Canada
Emigrants from the Russian Empire to France
White Russian emigrants to France
Governors of the Kiev Governorate